Mérida is the capital of the Mexican state of Yucatán, and the largest city in southeastern Mexico. The city is also the seat of the eponymous Municipality. It is located in the northwest corner of the Yucatán Peninsula, about 35 km (22 mi) inland from the coast of the Gulf of Mexico. In 2020 it had a population of 921,770 while its metropolitan area, which also includes the cities of Kanasín and Umán, had a population of 1,316,090.

The city's rich cultural heritage is a product of the syncretism of the Maya and Spanish cultures during the colonial era. It was the first city to be ever named American Capital of Culture and is the only city that has received the title twice. The Cathedral of Mérida, Yucatán was built in the late 16th century with stones from nearby Mayan ruins and is known to be the oldest cathedral in the mainland Americas. In addition, the city has the third largest old town district on the continent. In 2007, the city was visited by former U.S. President George W. Bush to meet with then-president of Mexico Felipe Calderón for the historic creation of the Mérida Initiative.

Mérida is often considered the safest city of Mexico and one of the safest cities in the Americas. In 2019 it hosted the 17th World Summit of Nobel Peace Laureates, receiving more than 30 of them. It is a City of Gastronomy as part of the UNESCO's Creative Cities Network. The UN-Habitat's City Prosperity Index recognized Mérida as the best city to live in Mexico for its high quality of life. The city was certified as an International Safe Community by the Karolinska Institute of Sweden for its high level of public security. Forbes magazine has ranked Mérida three different times as one of the three best cities in Mexico to live, invest and do business.

History

There were three Spanish conquistadors named "Francisco de Montejo": Francisco de Montejo "el Adelantado" ("The Lieutenant", the eldest); Francisco de Montejo y León "el Mozo" ("The Boy", his son); and Francisco de Montejo "el Sobrino" ("The Nephew"). Mérida was founded in 1542 by Montejo y León ("el Mozo") and named after the town of Mérida in Extremadura, Spain.  It was built on the site of the Maya city of T'hó (/tʼχoʼ/), which was also called Ichkanzihóo or Ichcaanzihó (/iʃkan'siχo/; "City of Five Hills") in reference to its pyramids.

Carved Maya stones from ancient T'ho were used to build the Spanish colonial buildings which are numerous in downtown Mérida; these stones are visible, for instance, in the walls of the main cathedral. Much of Mérida's architecture from the colonial period through the 18th century and 19th century is still standing in the centro histórico of the city. From colonial times through the mid-19th century, Mérida was a walled city intended to protect the Peninsular and Criollo residents from periodic revolts by the indigenous Maya. Several of the old Spanish city gates survive, but modern Mérida has expanded well beyond the old city walls.

Late in the 19th century and the early 20th Century, the area surrounding Mérida prospered from the production of henequén. For a brief period, around the turn of the 20th century, Mérida was said to house more millionaires than any other city in the world. The result of this concentration of wealth can still be seen today. Many large and elaborate homes still line the main avenue called Paseo de Montejo, though few are occupied today by individual families. Many of these homes have been restored and now serve as office buildings for banks and insurance companies. Korean immigration to Mexico began in 1905 when more than a thousand people arrived in Yucatán from the city of Incheon. These first Korean migrants settled around Mérida as workers in henequen plantations.

By the beginning of the 1900s manufacturing activities were mainly soap, tobacco products, leather, molasses, and rum.

Completed in 1911 by Camilo and Ernesto Cámara Zavala, "Las Casas Gemelas" (The Twin Houses), are two side by side French and Spanish style mansions that remain from the early 20th Century. They are two of only a few houses that are still used as residences on Paseo Montejo from that era. They are owned by the Barbachano and Molina Méndez families. During the Porfiriato, the Barbachano house held cultural events that hosted artists, poets, and writers. In the mid-1900s, the Barbachanos hosted aristocrats including Princess Grace and Prince Ranier of Monaco, as well as first lady of the U.S., Jacqueline Kennedy.

Mérida has one of the largest centro histórico districts in the Americas (surpassed only by Mexico City and Havana, Cuba). Colonial homes line the city streets to this day, in various states of disrepair and renovation; the historical center of Mérida is currently undergoing a minor renaissance as more and more people are moving into the old buildings and reviving their former glory.

In August 1993, Pope John Paul II visited the city on his third trip to Mexico. The city has been host to two bilateral United States – Mexico conferences, the first in 1999 (Bill Clinton – Ernesto Zedillo) and the second in 2007 (George W. Bush – Felipe Calderón).

In June 2007, Mérida moved its city museum to the renovated Post Office building next to the downtown market. The Museum of the City of Mérida houses important artifacts from the city's history, as well as an art gallery. Mérida hosted the VI Summit of Association of Caribbean States, in April 2014.

Mérida is the cultural and financial capital of the Yucatán Peninsula, as well as the capital city of the state of Yucatán. In recent years, important science competitions and World events have been held in Mérida – FITA Archery World Cup Finals, the International Cosmic Ray Conference, a Physics Olympiad, etc.

Geography

Mérida is located in the northwest part of the state of Yucatán, which occupies the northern portion of the Yucatán Peninsula. To the east is the state of Quintana Roo, to the west is the state of Campeche, to the north is the Gulf of Mexico, and far to the south is the state of Chiapas. The city is also located in the Chicxulub Crater. The land outside of Mérida is covered with smaller scrub trees and former henequen fields. Almost no surface water exists, but several cenotes (underground springs and rivers) are found across the state. Mérida has a centro histórico typical of colonial Spanish cities. The street grid is based on odd-numbered streets running east/west and even-numbered streets running north–south, with Calles 60 and 61 bounding the "Plaza Grande" in the heart of the city. The more affluent neighborhoods are located to the north and the most densely populated areas are to the south. The Centro Histórico area is becoming increasingly popular with Americans and other expatriates who are rescuing and restoring the classic colonial structures. In 2007 the Los Angeles Times recently noted this surge of interest in rescuing Mérida's historic downtown.

Climate
Mérida features a tropical savanna climate (Köppen: Aw). The city lies in the trade wind belt close to the Tropic of Cancer, with the prevailing wind from the east. Mérida's climate is hot and its humidity is moderate to high, depending on the time of year. It is most often a few degrees hotter in Mérida than in coastal areas due to its inland location and low elevation. The rainy season runs from June through October, associated with the Mexican monsoon which draws warm, moist air landward. Easterly waves and tropical storms also affect the area during this season.

Governance
 

Mérida is the constitutional capital of the state of Yucatán. State government officials reside here. The municipal or local government is invested under the authority of a City Council (Ayuntamiento) which it is seated at the Municipal Palace of Merida, located at the city's historic center. 
The City Council is presided by a municipal president or mayor, and an assembly conformed by a number of regents (regidores) and trustees (síndicos). Renán Barrera Concha became Mayor on September 1, 2018.

Economy 

The Yucatán Peninsula, in particular the capital city Mérida, is in a prime location which allows for economic growth. Mérida has been a popular location for investment. This, in turn, has allowed the Yucatán economy to grow at three times the rate of the national average.

In addition, the World Bank Group's Ease of Doing Business Index ranked Mérida fourth nationally in the category of ease of starting a business.

Science and technology 

The city is home to important national and local research institutes, like the Yucatan Scientific Research Center (Centro de Investigación Científica de Yucatán, CICY) of the National Council of Science and Technology (Consejo Nacional de Ciencia y Tecnología, Conacyt), a unit of the Center for Research and Advanced Studies of the National Polytechnic Institute (Centro de Investigación y de Estudios Avanzados, CINVESTAV Unidad Mérida), the Dr. Hideyo Noguchi Regional Research Center (Centro de Investigaciones Regionales Dr. Hideyo Noguchi) of the Autonomous University of Yucatan (CIR-UADY), the Yucatán Science and Technology Park (Parque Científico Tecnológico de Yucatán, PCYTY) and the Peninsular Center for Humanities and Social Sciences (Centro Peninsular en Humanidades y Ciencias Sociales, CEPHCIS) of the National Autonomous University of Mexico (UNAM).

Culture

Mérida has been nicknamed "The White City" (La Ciudad Blanca), though the exact origin of this moniker is not clear. Some explanations include the common color of its old buildings painted and decorated with "cal" or the fact that the residents keep the city particularly clean. Mérida was named after the Spanish town of the same name, originally (in Latin) Augústa Emérita (see Mérida, Spain). Mérida has served as the American Capital of Culture in the years 2000 and 2017.

As the state and regional capital, Mérida is a cultural center, featuring multiple museums, art galleries, restaurants, movie theatres, and shops. Mérida retains an abundance of colonial buildings and is a cultural center with music and dancing playing an important part in day-to-day life. At the same time it is a modern city with a range of shopping malls, auto dealerships, hotels, restaurants, and leisure facilities. The famous avenue Paseo de Montejo is lined with original sculpture. Each year, the MACAY Museum in Mérida mounts a new sculpture installation, featuring works from Mexico and one other chosen country. Each exhibit remains for ten months of the year. In 2007, sculptures on Paseo de Montejo featured works by artists from Mexico and Japan.

Mérida and the state of Yucatán have traditionally been isolated from the rest of the country by geography, creating a unique culture. The conquistadors found the Mayan culture to be incredibly resilient, and their attempts to eradicate Mayan tradition, religion, and culture had only moderate success. The surviving remnants of the Mayan culture can be seen every day, in speech, dress, and in both written and oral histories. It is especially apparent in holidays like Hanal Pixan, a Mayan/Catholic Day of the Dead celebration. It falls on November 1 and 2 (one day for adults, and one for children) and is commemorated by elaborate altars dedicated to dead relatives. It is a compromise between the two religions with crucifixes mingled with skull decorations and food sacrifices/offerings.  Múkbil pollo (pronounced/'mykβil pʰoʎoˀ/) is the Mayan tamal pie offered to the dead on All Saints' Day, traditionally accompanied by a cup of hot chocolate.  Many Yucatecans enjoy eating this on and around the Day of the Dead.  And, while complicated to make, they can be purchased and even shipped via air.  (Muk-bil literally means "to put in the ground" or to cook in a pib, an underground oven).

For English speakers or would-be speakers, Mérida has the Mérida English Library, a lending library with an extensive collection of English books, videos, tapes, and children's books. The library is also the site for expatriate meetings, children's storytelling hours, and other cultural events.

Mérida is also home to the Yucatán Symphony Orchestra, which plays regular seasons at the José Peón Contreras Theatre on Calle 60 and features classical music, jazz, and opera.

Food
Yucatán food is its own unique style and is very different from what most people consider "Mexican" food. It includes influences from the local Mayan cuisine, as well as Caribbean, Mexican, European and Middle Eastern foods. Tropical fruit, such as coconut, pineapple, plum, tamarind and mamey are often used in Yucatán cuisine.

There are many regional dishes. Some of them are:
Poc Chuc, a Mayan/Yucateco version of boiled/grilled pork
Salbutes and Panuchos. Salbutes are soft, cooked tortillas with lettuce, tomato, turkey and avocado on top. Panuchos feature fried tortillas filled with black beans, and topped with turkey or chicken, lettuce, avocado and pickled onions. Habanero chiles accompany most dishes, either in solid or puréed form, along with fresh limes and corn tortillas.
Queso Relleno is a gourmet dish featuring ground pork inside of a carved edam cheese ball served with tomato sauce
Pavo en Relleno Negro (also known locally as Chimole) is turkey meat stew cooked with a black paste made from roasted chiles, a local version of the mole de guajalote found throughout Mexico. The meat soaked in the black soup is also served in tacos, sandwiches and even in panuchos or salbutes.
Sopa de Lima is a lime soup with a chicken broth base often accompanied by shredded chicken or turkey and crispy tortilla.
Papadzules, egg tacos bathed with pumpkin seed sauce and tomatoes.
Cochinita pibil is a marinated pork dish, by far the most renowned from Yucatán, that is made with achiote. Achiote is a reddish spice with a distinctive flavor and peppery smell. It is also known by the Spanish (Recados) seasoning paste.
Bul keken (Mayan for "beans and pork") is a traditional black bean and pork soup. The soup is served in the home on Mondays in most Yucatán towns. The soup is usually served with chopped onions, radishes, chiles, and tortillas. This dish is also commonly referred to as frijol con puerco.
Brazo de reina (Spanish for "The Queen's Arm") is a traditional tamal dish. A long, flat tamal is topped with ground pumpkin seeds and rolled up like a roll cake. The long roll is then cut into slices. The slices are topped with a tomato sauce and a pumpkin seed garnish.
Tamales colados is a traditional dish made with pork/chicken, banana leaf, fresh corn masa and achiote paste, seasoned with roasted tomato sauce.

Achiote is a popular spice in the area. It is derived from the hard annatto seed found in the region. The whole seed is ground together with other spices and formed into a reddish seasoning paste, called recado rojo. The other ingredients in the paste include cinnamon, allspice berries, cloves, Mexican oregano, cumin seed, sea salt, mild black peppercorns, apple cider vinegar, and garlic.

Hot sauce in Mérida is usually made from the indigenous chiles in the area which include: Chile Xcatik, Chile Seco de Yucatán, and Chile Habanero.

Language and accent
The Spanish language spoken in the Yucatán is readily identifiable as different in comparison to the Spanish spoken all over the country, and even to non-native ears. It is heavily influenced by the Yucatec Maya language, which is spoken by a third of the population of the State of Yucatán. The Mayan language is melodic, filled with ejective consonants (p', k', and t') and "sh" sounds (represented by the letter "x" in the Mayan language). Even though many people speak Mayan, there is much stigma associated with it. It can be seen that elders were associated with higher status with knowledge of the language, but the younger generation saw more negative attitudes with knowledge of the language This was also in direct correlation with the socioeconomic status and their overall placement in society. There is also the idea that one is not speaking in the "correct" manner of legitimate Mayan dialect, which also causes for more differences in the accent and overall language of the area.

Due to being enclosed by the Caribbean Sea and the Gulf of Mexico, and being somewhat isolated from the rest of Mexico, Yucatecan Spanish has also preserved many words that are no longer used in many other Spanish-speaking areas of the world. However, over the years with the improvement of transportation and technology with the presence of radio, internet, and TV, many elements of the culture and language of the rest of Mexico are now slowly but consistently permeating the culture.

Apart from the Mayan language, which is the mother-tongue of many Yucatecans, students now choose to learn a foreign language such as English, which is taught in most schools.

Main sights

Historic sites 

 Antiguo convento de Nuestra Señora de la Consolación (Nuns)(1596)
 Barrio y Capilla de Santa Lucía (1575)
 Barrio y Templo Parroquial del antiguo pueblo de Itzimná
 Barrio y Templo Parroquial de San Cristóbal (1796)
 Barrio y Templo Parroquial de San Sebastián (1706)
 Barrio y Templo Parroquial de Santa Ana (1733)
 Barrio y Templo Parroquial de Santa Lucía (1575)
 Barrio y Templo Parroquial de Santiago (1637)
 Capilla de Nuestra Señora de la Candelaria (1706)
 Capilla y parque de San Juan Bautista (1552)
 Casa de Montejo (1549)
 Catedral de San Ildefonso (1598), first in continental América.
 Iglesia del Jesús o de la Tercera Orden (Third Order) (1618)
 Las Casas Gemelas aka The Twin Houses (1911)
 Monumento à la Patria (1956)
 Palacio de Gobierno (1892)
 Templo de San Juan de Dios (1562)

Cultural centers
 Centro Cultural Andrés Quintana Roo, in Santa Ana, with galleries and artistic events.
 Centro Cultural Olimpo. Next to the Municipal Palace in the Plaza Grande.
 Casa de la Cultura del Mayab, the Casa de Artesanías (house of handcrafts) resides there. It's in downtown Mérida.
 Centro Estatal de Bellas Artes (CEBA). Across the El Centenario, offers classes and education in painting, music, theater, ballet, jazz, folklore, dance, among others.
 Centro Cultural del Niño Yucateco (CECUNY) in Mejorada, in a 16th-century building, with classes and workshops specifically designed for kids.
 Centro Cultural Dante a private center within one of the major bookstores in Mérida (Librería Dante).

Museums

 Gran Museo del Mundo Maya, Yucatán's Mayan Museum, offers a view of Yucatán's history and identity. 
 Museo de Antropología e Historia "Palacio Cantón", Yucatán's history and archaeology Museum.
 Museo de Arte Contemporáneo Ateneo de Yucatán (MACAY), in the heart of the city right next to the cathedral. Permanent and rotating pictorial expositions.
 Museo de la Canción Yucateca Asociación Civil in Mejorada, honors the trova yucateca authors, Ricardo Palmerín, Guty Cárdenas, Juan Acereto, Pastor Cervera y Luis Espinosa Alcalá.
 Museo de la Ciudad de Mérida, in the old Correos (post office) building since 2007 offers information about the city from the prehispanic times' Tho' or Ichcaanzihó to current days.
 Museo de Historia Natural, a natural history museum.
 Museo de Arte Popular, popular art museum, offers a view of popular artistry and handcrafts among ethnic Mexican groups and cultures.
 Museo Conmemorativo de la Inmigración Coreana a Yucatán.

Major theaters with regular shows
 Teatro José Peón Contreras
 Teatro Daniel Ayala Pérez
 Teatro Mérida (Now Teatro Armando Manzanero) 
 Teatro Colón
 Teatro Universitario Felipe Carrillo Puerto
 Teatro Héctor Herrera

Sports
Several facilities can be found where to practice sports:

Estadio Salvador Alvarado in the center
Unidad Deportiva Kukulcán (with the major football Stadium Carlos Iturralde, Kukulcan BaseBall Park and Polifórum Zamná multipurpose arena)
Complejo deportivo La Inalambrica, in the west ( with archery facilities that held a world series championship )
Unidad deportiva Benito Juarez Garcia, in the northeast.
Gimnasio Polifuncional, where professional basketball team Mayas de Yucatán plays for the Liga Nacional de Baloncesto Profesional de México (LNBP) representing Yucatán.

The city is home to the Mérida Marathon, held each year since 1986.

Transportation

Bus 

City service is mostly provided by four local transportation companies: Unión de Camioneros de Yucatán (UCY), Alianza de Camioneros de Yucatán (ACY), Rápidos de Mérida, and Minis 2000. Bus transportation is at the same level or better than that of bigger cities like Guadalajara or Mexico City. Climate-controlled buses and micro-buses (smaller in size) are not uncommon.

The main bus terminal (CAME) offers first-class (ADO) and luxury services (ADO PLATINO, ADO GL) to most southern Mexico cities outside Yucatán with a fleet consisting of Mercedes Benz and Volvo buses. Shorter intrastate routes are serviced by many smaller terminals around the city, mainly in downtown.

Taxis
Several groups and unions offer taxi transportation: Frente Único de los Trabajadores del Volante (FUTV) (white taxis), Unión de Taxistas Independientes (UTI), and Radiotaxímetros de Yucatán, among others. Some of them offer metered service, but most work based on a flat rate depending on destination. Competition has made it of more common use than it was years ago.

Taxis can be either found at one of many predefined places around the city (Taxi de Sitio), waved down along the road, or called in by radio. Unlike the sophisticated RF counterparts in the US, a Civil Band radio is used and is equally effective. Usually a taxi will respond and arrive within 5 minutes.

Another type of taxi service is called "Colectivo". Colectivo taxis work like small buses on a predefined route and for a small fare. Usually accommodating 8 to 10 people.

Uber also offers services in Mérida.

Air

Mérida (IATA: MID, ICAO: MMMD) is serviced by Manuel Crescencio Rejón International Airport with daily non-stop services to major cities in Mexico including Mexico City, Monterrey, Villahermosa, Cancún, Guadalajara, Tuxtla Gutierrez, and Toluca. The airport has international flights to Miami, Houston, La Havana and Toronto.   more than 1 million passengers were using this airport every year, (1.3 in 2007). The airport is under ASUR administration.

Train
There is no longer passenger train service to the city. For a century Mérida was the hub an extensive narrow gauge railway network which was phased out in the late 20th century. The Yucatán and Campeche railway network was only connected to the rest of Mexico in 1950. Formerly the "Meridano" train ran from Mexico City to Mérida.

The Tren Maya, under construction , would connect Cancún to Palenque, Chiapas with intermediate stops on the Yucatán peninsula including one near Mérida.

Roads
Main roads in and out of Mérida:
It joins the city with Yucatán's biggest port city, Progreso.
 Mérida-Umán-Campeche (Federal 180), connects with the city of San Francisco de Campeche.
 Mérida-Kantunil-Cancún (Federal 180), 4 lane road that becomes a Toll road at kantunil.  It joins Mérida with Chichén Itzá, Valladolid and ultimately Cancún.
 Mérida-Tizimín (Federal 176) connects Mérida with Tizimín (2nd. largest city in Yucatán).
 Mérida-Teabo-Peto known as Mundo Maya Road Carretera del Mundo Maya, its used in both "convent route" Ruta de los Conventos, and linking the ancient maya city of Mayapán and Chetumal, state capitol of Quintana Roo

Health

Mérida has many regional hospitals and medical centers. All of them offer full services for the city and in case of the Regional Hospitals for the whole Yucatán peninsula and neighboring states.

The city has one of the most prestigious medical faculties in Mexico (UADY). Proximity to American cities like Houston allow local Doctors to crosstrain and practice in both countries making Mérida one of the best cities in Mexico in terms of health services availability.

Hospitals:

 Public:
 Hospital Regional del ISSSTE
 Hospital Ignacio García Téllez Mexican Social Security Institute (IMSS)
 Hospital Benito Juárez IMSS
 Hospital Agustin O'Horán
 Hospital Regional de Alta Especialidad
Private:
 Clínica de Mérida
 Star Médica
 Centro Médico de las Américas (CMA)
 Centro de Especialidades Médicas
 Hospital Santelena
 Centro Médico Pensiones (CMP)
 Hospital Faro Del Mayab

Education

In 2000 the Mérida municipality had 244 preschool institutions, 395 elementary, 136 Jr. high school (2 years middle school, 1 high), 97 High Schools and 16 Universities/Higher Education schools. Mérida has consistently held the status of having the best performing public schools in Mexico since 1996. The public school system is regulated by the Secretariat of Public Instruction. Attendance is required for all students in the educational system from age 6 up to age 15. Once students reach high school, they are given the option of continuing their education or not; if they chose to do so they are given two tracks in which they can graduate.

Nevertheless, education in Merida has a variety of quality throughout the city. This mainly has to do with the different social strata and where they reside. Mayan indigenous population are at the bottom of the spectrum and this can be represented in the type of education that the children are receiving. Upper class is usually located in the north, as it is less populated and has higher living costs. For the most part, private schools are located in the northern part of the city. The only students who attend these schools are those of high class and of non-Maya descent. A distressing statistic of how this affects the indigenous communities can be noted, "In Yucatan only 8.9 % of the Mayans have achieved junior high and solely the 6.6% have studied beyond that point. The 83.4% of the Mayans 15 years old and older dropped out of school before finishing junior high."

Many laws have been set in place to avoid discrimination between the Spanish speakers and the Mayan speakers as the "Law says that it is a duty of the Mexican State to guarantee —guarantee, not just try, not just attempt— that the indigenous population has access to the obligatory education, bilingual and intercultural in their methods and contents." Despite this having been set into law, there is no bilingual or cultural accepting program after elementary school. The system for indigenous education only serves about one third of the Mayan speaking population of the area. Many Mayan children are forced to learn Spanish and cease using their native tongue, which may be challenging for them to do. This in turn causes many of the students to feel that learning at school is not their strong suit and may even end up dropping out early in their education.
There are several state institutions offering higher education:

 Universidad Autónoma de Yucatán (UADY)
 Universidad Tecnológica Metropolitana (UTM)
 Instituto Tecnológico de Mérida (ITM)
 Escuela Superior de Artes de Yucatán (ESAY)
 Universidad Pedagógica Nacional
 Escuela Normal Superior de Yucatán (ENSY)
 Universidad Nacional Autónoma de México Merida satellite campus (UNAM)
 Universidad Politécnica de Yucatán (UPY)

Among several private institutions:

 Centro de Estudios Superiores CTM (CESCTM)
 Colegio de Negocios Internacionales (CNI)
 Universidad Anáhuac Mayab
 Universidad Marista
 Centro de Estudios Universitarios del Mayab (CEUM)
 Universidad Modelo
 Universidad Interamericana para el Desarrollo (UNID)
 Centro Educativo Latino (CEL)
 Universidad Interamericana del Norte
 Centro Universitario Interamericano(Inter)
 Universidad Mesoamericana de San Agustin (UMSA)
 Centro de Estudios de las Américas, A.C. (CELA)
 Universidad del Valle de Mexico (UVM)
 Instituto de Ciencias Sociales de Mérida (ICSMAC)
 Universidad Popular Autónoma de Puebla, Plantel Mérida (UPAEP Mérida)
Mérida has several national research centers. Among them

 Centro de Investigacíón Científica de Yucatán (CICY)
 Centro de Investigaciones Regionales Dr. Hideyo Noguchi, dependent from the UADY, conducts biological and biomedical research.
 Centro INAH Yucatán, dedicated to anthropological, archaeological and historic research.
 Centro de Investigación y de Estudios Avanzados CINVESTAV/IPN

See also

 Timeline of Mérida
 
 List of twin towns and sister cities in Mexico

References

External links
 Website of the Ayuntamiento de Mérida (Municipality of Mérida)

People from Mérida, Yucatán
 
Cities in Mexico

Capitals of states of Mexico
Capitals of former nations
Populated places established in 1542
1542 establishments in New Spain
1540s establishments in Mexico
1542 in New Spain
Tourist attractions in Mexico
Municipality seats in Yucatán